The Yates Center Carnegie Library, located at 218 N. Main in Yates Center in Woodson County, Kansas, is a Carnegie library which was built in about 1912.  It was listed on the National Register of Historic Places in 1987.

It is a one-story red brick building on a raised foundation. It has a five-sided projecting entry bay.

Simmons designed five other Carnegie libraries in Kansas, including two other NRHP-listed ones: Council Grove Carnegie Library and Downs Carnegie Library.

References

Libraries on the National Register of Historic Places in Kansas
Library buildings completed in 1912
Woodson County, Kansas
Carnegie libraries in Kansas